The Little League Softball World Series is a softball tournament for girls aged 10 to 12 years old. It was first held in 1974 and is held every August at Stallings Stadium in Greenville, North Carolina, in the United States. Little League expanded the field of World Series participants to 12 in 2022, adding 2 regions in the United States.  Before being held in Greenville, it was held outside of Portland, Oregon at Alpenrose Stadium.

Qualification Regionals
The champion of each of the eight United States regional tournaments competes in the Little League Softball World Series. In 2022, the East and West regions were divided to create four new regions (Mid-Atlantic, New England, Northwest, and West):
 Central Region (Illinois, Indiana, Iowa, Kansas, Kentucky, Michigan, Minnesota, Missouri, Nebraska, North Dakota, Ohio, South Dakota, Wisconsin)
 East Region 
Mid-Atlantic Region (Delaware, District of Columbia, Maryland, New Jersey, New York, Pennsylvania)
New England Region (Connecticut, Maine, Massachusetts, New Hampshire, Rhode Island, Vermont) 
 Southeast Region (Alabama, Florida, Georgia, North Carolina, South Carolina, Tennessee, Virginia, West Virginia)
 Southwest Region (Arkansas, Colorado, Louisiana, Mississippi, New Mexico, Oklahoma, Texas East, Texas West)
 West Region
Northwest Region (Alaska, Idaho, Montana, Oregon, Washington, Wyoming)
West Region (Arizona, Hawaii, Nevada, Northern California, Southern California, Utah)
 Host Region (North Carolina)

The champion of each of the four international regional tournaments competes in the Little League Softball World Series:
 Asia-Pacific Region
 Canada Region
 Europe and Africa Region
 Latin America Region

Past champions

Championship tally

Championships won by country/state/county

See also
Junior League World Series (softball)
List of Little League Softball World Series champions by division

References

 
Little League
Softball competitions
Softball competitions in the United States
Youth softball
Youth sport in the United States
Women's sports in the United States
Sports in Portland, Oregon
Sports in North Carolina
Recurring sporting events established in 1974
World youth sports competitions